Victor Albury (May 12, 1947 – April 18, 2017) was a professional baseball pitcher. He played in four seasons with the Minnesota Twins, appearing in 101 games and amassing a career record of 18–17. In , Albury finished ninth in the American League in walks allowed, with 97. Albury was selected by the Cleveland Indians in the ninth round (173rd overall) of the 1965 draft out of Key West High School, but never played in the majors with the Indians.

External links

1947 births
2017 deaths
American expatriate baseball players in Mexico
Baseball players from Florida
Charlotte Hornets (baseball) players
Dubuque Packers players
Key West Padres players
Leones del Caracas players
American expatriate baseball players in Venezuela
Lodi Padres players
Major League Baseball pitchers
Mexican League baseball pitchers
Minnesota Twins players
People from Key West, Florida
Puerto Rico Boricuas players
Salt Lake City Bees players
Sultanes de Monterrey players
Syracuse Chiefs players
Tacoma Twins players
Key West High School alumni